Dendropsophus seniculus is a species of frog in the family Hylidae.
It is endemic to Brazil.
Its natural habitats are subtropical or tropical moist lowland forests, swamps, freshwater marshes, intermittent freshwater marshes, and rural gardens.
It is threatened by habitat loss.

References

seniculus
Endemic fauna of Brazil
Amphibians described in 1868
Taxonomy articles created by Polbot